Harry Sweet (October 2, 1901 – June 18, 1933) was an American actor, director and screenwriter. He appeared in 57 films between 1919 and 1932.  He also directed 54 films between 1920 and 1933, including one Harry Langdon short, two of the Tay Garnett- penned comedies Stan Laurel made for Joe Rock, and fifteen of the earliest entries in the Edgar Kennedy "Average Man" series.

Sweet was an acrobat before he became an actor, which led to his doing his own stunts in films.

Death
On June 18, 1933, Sweet was location scouting by private plane in the vicinity of Big Bear Valley. That night, at 7:15 pm, a plane crashed and sank to the bottom of Big Bear Lake, with the authorities initially uncertain as to the identity of the pilot as well as the number and identity of the plane's passengers; on June 19, Bert Gilroy, a film associate of Sweet's, left Los Angeles for Big Bear after efforts to contact the director in that city failed. Hours after the accident, when the plane was pulled from 28 feet of water, the bodies of Sweet, actress Claudette Ford, and scenario writer Howard (Hal) Davitt, were found in the cockpit; the coroner's investigation determined Sweet had drowned and that his companions had both died from fractured skulls suffered in the crash.

Selected acting filmography
 Carnival Boat (1932)
 Her Man (1930)
 Hit the Deck (1930)
 Homesick (1928)
 Fascinating Youth (1926)
 Smart Alec (1921)

Selected directing filmography
 She Outdone Him (1933)   July 21, 1933        Script: Hugh Cummings, Harry Sweet  
 Good Housewrecking (1933)    June 16, 1933        Script: Harry Sweet  
 A Merchant of Menace (1933)   April 21, 1933        Script: Leslie Goodwins, Walter Weems  
 Art in the Raw (1933)    February 24, 1933        Script: Ben Holmes, Harry Sweet  ...
 Fish Feathers (1932)     December 16, 1932        Script: Hugh Cummings, Harry Sweet 
 Sham Poo, the Magician (1932)     November 25, 1932        Script: Hugh Cummings, Harry Sweet  
 Parlor, Bedroom and Wrath (1932)   October 14, 1932        Script: Hugh Cummings, Harry Sweet  
 The Golf Chump (1932)     August 5, 1932        Script: Hugh Cummings, Harry Sweet  
 High Hats and Low Brows (1932)     July 11, 1932        Script: Arthur 'Bugs' Baer, Ralph Ceder   
 Giggle Water (1932)     June 27, 1932        Script: Harry Sweet  
 Stealin' Home (1932)    May 9, 1932        Script: Arthur 'Bugs' Baer, Ralph Ceder  
 Rule 'Em and Weep (1932)   May 2, 1932        Script: Edward Earle, Walter Weems  
 Mother-in-Law's Day (1932)    April 25, 1932        Script: Harry Sweet  
 Extra! Extra! (1932)     April 4, 1932        Script: Ralph Ceder, Lex Neal  
 Battle Royal (1932)    February 29, 1932        Script: Arthur 'Bugs' Baer, Ralph Ceder  
 Bon Voyage (1932)     February 22, 1932        Script: Harry Sweet  
 The Big Scoop (1931)   November 16, 1931        Script: Everett Alton Brown, Hal Yates 
 Slow Poison (1931)   October 19, 1931        Script: Arthur 'Bugs' Baer, Ralph Ceder 
 Thanks Again (1931)  Script: Harry Sweet     October 5, 1931  
 Lemon Meringue (1931)   August 3, 1931       Script: Harry Sweet  
 All Gummed Up (1931)  May 23, 1931        Script: Harry Sweet  
 Not So Loud (1931)     May 3, 1931        Script: Harry Sweet  
 Rough House Rhythm (1931)   April 5, 1931        Script: Harry Sweet 
 Hot Wires (1931)   February 22, 1931        Script: Chuck Callahan, Harry L. Fraser  
 Next Door Neighbors (1931)   January 28, 1931        Script: George Green, Harry Sweet  
 Waltzing Around (1929)     May 13, 1929        Script: Paul Gerard Smith 
 Music Fiends (1929)   April 3, 1929        Script: Clark & McCullough   
 Beneath the Law (1929)   March 7, 1929        Script: Clark & McCullough ...
 Half a Man (1925) Script: Tay Garnett 
 The Sleuth (1925) Script: Tay Garnett

References

External links

1901 births
1933 deaths
Victims of aviation accidents or incidents in the United States
American male film actors
American male silent film actors
American film directors
American male screenwriters
Male actors from Colorado
Accidental deaths in California
20th-century American male actors
20th-century American male writers
20th-century American screenwriters